Jaare or Jarre  , is a town located in the western Fafan Zone in the Somali region of Ethiopia in the Awbare district.

Demographics
The town is primarily inhabited by the Abokor subclan of the Makayl-Dheere branch of the Gadabuursi Dir clan.

Filipo Ambrosio (1994) describes Jaare as being predominantly Gadabuursi:
"Jarso and Geri then sought refuge on 'neutral' adjacent Gadabursi territory in Heregel, Jarre and Lefeisa."

References

Populated places in Ethiopia